Love on Wheels is a 1932 British musical comedy film directed by Victor Saville and starring Jack Hulbert, Gordon Harker, Edmund Gwenn and Leonora Corbett.

Plot
A daily commuter on a Green Line bus from the suburbs to Central London Fred Hopkins romantically pursues a fellow passenger Jane with the help of Briggs the bus conductor. His hopes are thwarted when he is fired from his job at a major department store. However he is eventually able to return, securing both his dream job as advertising manager in charge of window dressing and the girl he loves.

Cast
 Jack Hulbert as Fred Hopkins
 Leonora Corbett as Jane Russell
 Gordon Harker as Briggs
 Edmund Gwenn as Philpotts
 Tony De Lungo as Bronelli
 Percy Parsons as American Crook
 Roland Culver as Salesman
 Miles Malleson as Academy of Music Porter
 Martita Hunt as Piano Demonstrator
 Maria Milza as Mrs Bronelli

Production
The film was made at the Islington Studios of Gainsborough Pictures. Gainsborough was part of the larger Gaumont British empire, and specialised in making comedies during the 1930s. Hulbert became one of the studio's top stars during the early 1930s, often appearing with his wife Cicely Courtneidge.

Critical reception
BFI Screenonline called the film a "sublime musical comedy." and British Pictures called it "one of those charmingly amateurish British musicals the 30s produced so well. It proclaims: we may not have dancers like Fred and Ginger, or songwriters like Gershwin or Berlin, or directors like Busby Berkeley, but when it comes to endearing silliness we're world class...Love on Wheels is never going to make the critics Top 100 list, it certainly leaves a smile on your face."

References

External links

1932 films
British musical comedy films
1932 musical comedy films
Films directed by Victor Saville
Gainsborough Pictures films
Films set in London
British black-and-white films
Films with screenplays by Franz Schulz
Films with screenplays by Victor Saville
1930s English-language films
1930s British films